Joel E. Harrell and Son is a historic pork processing factory complex located at Suffolk, Virginia. It was built in 1941, and consists of the Office Building and the Main Building. The Office Building is a one-story, seven bay by six bay, brick building.  The Main Building was constructed to house all phases of the production process, including the slaughterhouse, curing rooms, and coolers.  It is a one-story, brick building enlarged in 1946, 1955, and the 1970s. The Main Building was damaged by fire in 2005.  The complex is representative of a small family-based pork processing facility.

It was added to the National Register of Historic Places in 2006.

References

Industrial buildings and structures on the National Register of Historic Places in Virginia
Industrial buildings completed in 1941
Buildings and structures in Suffolk, Virginia
National Register of Historic Places in Suffolk, Virginia
Meat companies of the United States
Pork